Graceus is a genus of European non-biting midges in the subfamily Chironominae of the bloodworm family Chironomidae.

Species
G. ambiguus Goetghebuer 1928

References

Chironomidae
Diptera of Europe